Phase Space is an album of duets by saxophonist Steve Coleman and bassist Dave Holland recorded in 1991 and released on the Japanese DIW label.

Reception
The AllMusic review by Don Snowden states, "No grandstanding, no coasting -- just two masterful musicians playing together and taking the listener along for the ride".

Track listing
All compositions by Steve Coleman except as indicated
 "Ah-Leu-Cha" (Charlie Parker) - 7:57  
 "Dream of the Elders" (Dave Holland) - 7:23  
 "Syzygy" – 5:07  
 "Straight Ahead" (Mal Waldron) - 8:27  
 "In Brief" - 5:28  
 "Prescience" - 6:27  
 "Cud Ba-Rith" - 4:30  
 "Little Girl I'll Miss You" (Bunky Green) - 7:38  
 "See Saw" (Holland) - 6:31

Personnel
Steve Coleman - alto saxophone
Dave Holland - bass

References 

1992 albums
Steve Coleman albums
Dave Holland albums
DIW Records albums